The Old Cheboygan County Courthouse is a government building located at 229 Court Street in Cheboygan, Michigan.  It was designated a Michigan State Historic Site in 1975 and listed on the National Register of Historic Places in 1986.

History
Cheboygan County was organized in 1853, and the county seat was located in Duncan.  In 1860, the county board of supervisors moved the county seat to this location.  The building was constructed in 1869 by James F. Watson for $3000.  The building served as a courthouse until 1899, when the county built a new courthouse.

After the court moved, the old courthouse was used for multiple purposes through the years, including a fire station, a church, a community center, a boxing gym, a veteran's center, and simply for storage. In 1983, the building was extensively renovated and turned into law offices. It currently serves as the Cheboygan office of the law firm Bodman PLC.

Description
When built, it contained a courtroom on the second floor and county offices on the first.

References

Courthouses on the National Register of Historic Places in Michigan
Government buildings completed in 1869
Buildings and structures in Cheboygan County, Michigan
Michigan State Historic Sites
County courthouses in Michigan
1869 establishments in Michigan
National Register of Historic Places in Cheboygan County, Michigan